International Luteray is a 1994 Pakistani action film, directed by Iqbal Kashmiri and produced by Farooq Mirza. Editor: Mohammed Ashiq Ali The film stars actors Neeli, Sultan Rahi, Nadeem, Ghulam Mohiuddin, Humayun Qureshi.

Cast
 Sultan Rahi
 Nadeem
 Saima (double role)
 Ghulam Mohiuddin
 Madiha Shah
 Afzal Khan
 Nargis
 Deeba
 Qavi
 Humayun Qureshi
 Asim Bukhari
 Albela

Soundtrack

Track listing

References

External links
 

1994 films
Pakistani political films
Pakistani action films
1994 action films
Punjabi-language Pakistani films
1990s in Sri Lanka

Political action films